Xylodromus fleischeri is a species of rove beetle in the Omaliinae subfamily that is endemic to Romania.

References 

Beetles described in 1917
Omaliinae
Endemic fauna of Romania